Iolaus shaba is a butterfly in the family Lycaenidae. It is found in the Democratic Republic of the Congo.

Adults have been recorded in September.

References

Butterflies described in 1995
Iolaus (butterfly)
Endemic fauna of the Democratic Republic of the Congo
Butterflies of Africa